The following television stations broadcast on digital channel 50 in the United States:

 K50GA-D in Laketown, etc., Utah, on virtual channel 14, which rebroadcasts KJZZ-TV
 K50GL-D in Bonners Ferry, Idaho, to move to channel 26
 KHDE-LD in Denver, Colorado, to move to channel 4, on virtual channel 51
 KTCJ-LD in Minneapolis, Minnesota, to move to channel 13, on virtual channel 50
 W50CO in Jacksonville, Florida, to move to channel 32
 WHOB-LD in Buxton, North Carolina, to move to channel 35
 WQUB500 in Camp Verde, Arizona, on virtual channel 18, which rebroadcasts K18DD-D

The following stations, which are no longer licensed, formerly broadcast on digital channel 50:
 K50DY-D in Capulin, etc., New Mexico
 K50MO-D in Palmer, Alaska
 K50NL-D in Lowry, South Dakota
 KATA-CD in Mesquite, Texas
 KBIT-LD in Chico, California
 W50EQ-D in Lumberton, North Carolina
 WQEH-LD in Jackson, Tennessee

References

50 digital TV stations in the United States